When have we eaten from the same dish? is a Spanish idiom about someone who has "taken too many liberties" and caused irritation or offense. It is usually made as hierarchical social commentary about poor manners or incivility, said to someone perceived to be acting above their social standing, position, class or rank. It is also used as a statement, When we have eaten from the same dish.

Background

According to José María Sbarbi, in his dictionary of proverbs, the saying comes from a great lord who organized a feast. At the table, the place makers required that each lady had a gentleman by her side. For each couple there was only one dish, a single glass and a single knife, even though the couples were strangers. The talent of the host was to place the guests in such a way that the familiarity between them was pleasing to both.

Human social relationships and rituals are built upon food and its consumption. Traditionally, sharing food has suggested a level of intimacy between the people sharing the meal. The expression is used as a cutting remark; when asking if two people are eating from the same plate, what one is really saying is, "are we on such familiar terms that you can treat me with disrespect?"

Eating with one's hands is still a custom in parts of Asia, the Middle East and Africa. In many countries, family and friends often ate from a communal bowl. With that came a whole set of customs and expectations. Shared food is one of the most intimate and generous acts. People sit to eat with their family and friends, and to celebrate special occasions. In many countries hosts are judged on their hospitality and the food they serve. Hospitality is referenced in the Quran, and in other religious texts. Specifically the story of Abraham and the three visitors involves the sharing of food. Likewise, in the New Testament Parable of the Wedding Feast. In the Gospel of Matthew, Jesus uses the sharing of food to highlight his upcoming betrayal and imprecate Judas.

Variants

Similar phrases are used in various languages.
 
 (We have not kept the pigs together.)

See also
Dicho, paremiology or Spanish proverbs
 Honour thy father and thy mother
 Kids' table
 Don't get above your raisin'

References

External links

Spanish-language idioms